Barbados Quest, released in the United States as Murder On Approval is a 1955 British crime drama film directed by Bernard Knowles.

Plot
An American philatelist pays £10,000 for what he thinks is a rare postage stamp. After he becomes concerned of its authenticity he employs detective "Duke" Tom Martin (Tom Conway) to investigate.

Cast
Tom Conway as Tom Martin
Delphi Lawrence as Jean Larson
Brian Worth as Geoffrey Blake
Michael Balfour as Barney Wilson
Campbell Cotts as Robert Coburn
John Horsley as Det. Insp. Taylor
Ronan O'Casey as Stefan Gordoni
Launce Maraschal as J.D. Everleigh
Colin Tapley as Lord Valchrist
Alan Gifford as Henry Warburg
Grace Arnold as Lady Hawksley
John Colicos as Mustachioed Henchman (as John Collicos)
Mayura as Yasmina
John Watson as Detective Sgt. Grant
Reggie Morris as Cleanshaven Henchman (as Reg Morris)
Marianne Stone as Mrs. Wilson - Woman Cleaner
Derrick Whittingham as Print Shop Manager

Critical reception
TV Guide noted "An inept mystery."

See also
 Breakaway (1955)

References

External links

1955 films
1955 crime drama films
British crime drama films
Films directed by Bernard Knowles
British detective films
RKO Pictures films
1950s English-language films
1950s British films
British black-and-white films